The 1953 Shaw Bears football team was an American football team that represented Shaw University as a member of the Central Intercollegiate Athletic Association (CIAA) during the 1953 college football season. Led by Howard K. Wilson in his seventh and final year as head coach, Shaw returned to competition after not fielding a football team in 1952. The team's captain was Pete Hawkins, who played center, and the co-captain was Wilson Chambers. Playing their home games at Chavis Park in Raleigh, North Carolina, the Bears finished the season with an overall record of 2–7 and a conference mark of 2–4.

Schedule

References

Shaw
Shaw Bears football seasons
Shaw Bears football